The 2017 Bilderberg Conference took place between 1-4 June 2017 at the Westfields Marriott Hotel in Chantilly, Virginia, United States. Previous Bilderberg conferences were held here in 2002, 2008 and 2012. 

Bilderberg conferences are an annual private gathering of 120 to 150 people of the European and North American political elite, experts from industry, finance, academia, and the media, established in 1954 by Prince Bernhard.

Agenda
A list of key topics for discussion at the 2017 Bilderberg conference was published on the Bilderberg website shortly before the meeting. Topics for discussion included:

The Trump Administration: A progress report 
Transatlantic relations
The Transatlantic defence alliance: bullets, bytes and bucks
The direction of the European Union
Globalization
Climate change
Jobs, income and unrealised expectations
Fake news
Why is populism growing?
Russia in the international order
The Near East
Nuclear proliferation
China
Current events

Delegates (alphabetical)
A list of expected delegates was published by the Bilderberg Group.

Chairman: Henri de Castries

Paul Achleitner
Andrew Adonis, Baron Adonis
Marcus Agius
Mustafa Akyol
Roger Altman
Frank Bsirske
José Manuel Barroso
Oliver Bäte
Werner Baumann
René Benko
Anne Berner
Ana Patricia Botín
Svein Richard Brandtzæg
John O. Brennan
Thomas Buberl
William J. Burns
Juan Luis Cebrián
Kristin Clemet
David S. Cohen
Patrick Collison
Tom Cotton
Cui Tiankai
Mathias Döpfner
John Elkann
Tom Enders
Roger W. Ferguson Jr.
Niall Ferguson
Fabiola Gianotti
Sandro Gozi
Lindsey Graham
Evan G. Greenberg
Kenneth C. Griffin
Lilli Gruber
Luis de Guindos
Avril Haines
Victor Halberstadt
Ralph Hamers
Connie Hedegaard
Jeanine Hennis-Plasschaert
Mellody Hobson
Reid Hoffman
Nick Houghton
Wolfgang Ischinger
Kenneth M. Jacobs
James A. Johnson
Vernon Jordan
Alex Karp
Carsten Kengeter
Henry Kissinger
Susanne Klatten
Klaus Kleinfeld
Klaas Knot
Stephen Kotkin
Henry Kravis
Marie-Josée Kravis
André Kudelski
Christine Lagarde
Thomas Leysen
Chris Liddell
Annie Lööf
Jessica Mathews
Terry McAuliffe
David I. McKay
H. R. McMaster
John Micklethwait
Zanny Minton Beddoes
Maurizio Molinari
Lisa Monaco
Bill Morneau
Craig Mundie
Willem-Alexander of the Netherlands
Peggy Noonan
Michael O'Leary
Denis O'Brien
George Osborne
Alexis Papahelas
David Petraeus
Søren Pind
Benoît Puga
Gideon Rachman
Heather Reisman
Albert Rivera
Johanna Rosén
Wilbur Ross
David Rubenstein
Robert Rubin
Gwendolyn Rutten
Michael Sabia
John Sawers
Eric Schmidt
Johann Schneider-Ammann
Beppe Severgnini
Radosław Sikorski
Boyan Slat
Jens Spahn
Randall L. Stephenson
Jens Stoltenberg
Lawrence Summers
Peter Sutherland
Peter Thiel
J. D. Vance
Björn Wahlroos
Marcus Wallenberg
Amy Walter
Galen Weston Jr.
Sharon White
Leon Wieseltier
Martin Wolf
James Wolfensohn

Gerhard Zeiler
Jeffrey Zients
Robert Zoellick

See also
List of Bilderberg meetings

References

Conferences in the United States
2017 Bilderberg Conference
2017 conferences
2017 in Virginia
June 2017 events in the United States